"Good Company" is a song recorded by American country music singer Jake Owen. It is the third and final single from his 2016 album American Love, and his last single for RCA Records Nashville.

Content
The song was written by Matt Alderman, Tommy Cecil, and Jared Mullins, with production handled by Owen and Lukas Bracewell.

Owen described the song to Billboard as follows: "The song to me really parallels with what the song feels like. I love songs like that where you can almost put yourself in a place and imagine where you are – [“Good Company”] is where you would be with your friends and family, having a good time with good people and making great memories." The song was described by Taste of Country as " a mid-tempo groove and a beach-y lyric that's perfect for summer." It features steel drums and a horn section, with a reggae-style beat and a lyric about celebrating and making memories with friends

Music video
Released in May 2017, the song's music video was filmed in Grand Cayman, Colin Cooper and Austin Bever directed the video.

Chart performance

Weekly charts

Year-end charts

References

2017 songs
2017 singles
Jake Owen songs
RCA Records singles